The 1874 Newfoundland general election was held in 1874 to elect members of the 12th General Assembly of Newfoundland in the Colony of Newfoundland. The Conservative Party led by Frederick Carter formed the government.

Results by party

Elected members
 Twillingate-Fogo
 F.B.T. Carter Conservative
 Charles Duder Conservative
 William Kelligrew Conservative
 Bonavista Bay
 John H. Warren Conservative
 Charles Bowring Conservative
 A. J. W. McNeily Conservative
 Trinity Bay
 William V. Whiteway Conservative
 John Steer Conservative
 James H. Watson Conservative
 Bay de Verde
 James J. Rogerson Conservative
 Carbonear
 John Rorke Conservative
 Harbour Grace
 Ambrose Shea Liberal
 Joseph Godden
 Brigus-Port de Grave
 Nathaniel Rabbits Conservative
 St. John's East
 Robert J. Kent Liberal
 Robert J. Parsons Liberal
 J. J. Dearin Liberal
 St. John's West
 Lewis Tessier Liberal
 Maurice Fenelon Liberal
 P. J. Scott Liberal
 Harbour Main
 Joseph I. Little Liberal
 Patrick Nowlan Liberal
 Ferryland
 Richard Raftus Liberal
 James G. Conroy Liberal
 Placentia and St. Mary's
 C. F. Bennett Liberal
 James Collins Liberal
 Michael E. Dwyer Liberal
 Burin
 Charles R. Ayre Conservative
 James S. Winter Conservative
 Fortune Bay
 Robert Alexander Conservative
 Burgeo-LaPoile
 Prescott Emerson Conservative (speaker)
 Alexander M. Mackay Conservative; elected later

References 
 
 

1874
1874 elections in North America
1874 elections in Canada
Pre-Confederation Newfoundland
1874 in Newfoundland